Behind the Facade (French: Derrière la façade) is a 1939 French drama film directed by Georges Lacombe and Yves Mirande and starring Lucien Baroux, Jules Berry and André Lefaur. The film's sets were designed by the art director Lucien Aguettand. It was shot at the Epinay Studios in Paris.

Synopsis
When the owner of an apartment block is found murdered, two policeman investigate the lives of the various tenants who live there.

Cast
 Lucien Baroux as Le commissaire Boucheron  
 Jules Berry as Alfrédo D'Avila  
 André Lefaur as Corbeau  
 Gaby Morlay as Gaby  
 Elvire Popesco as Madame Rameau  
 Michel Simon as Picking 
 Betty Stockfeld as L'anglaise  
 Erich von Stroheim as Eric  
 Simone Berriau as Lydia 
 Missia as Joséphine Picking  
 Raymond Segard as Robert Bernier  
 Marcel Orluc as Gérard Bernier 
 Jean Daurand as Le télégraphiste  
 Elmire Vautier as Marie, l'habilleuse de Lydia  
 Lina Darwils as Une locataire  
 Robert Ozanne as Le brigadier  
 Claude Sainval as Le gigolo de Gaby  
 Raymone as La bonne de Madame Mathieu  
 Jean Joffre as Monsieur Martin, l'aveugle  
 Lise Courbet as Paulette 
 Andrex as André Laurent, l'employé de banque  
 Julien Carette as Le soldat 
 Aimé Clariond as Le président Bernier  
 Jacques Dumesnil as Albert Durant, le jouer de poker  
 Paul Faivre as Le concierge  
 Marcel Simon as Jules, l'amant de Gaby 
 Gaby Sylvia as Madeleine Martin  
 Gabrielle Dorziat as Madame Bernier  
 Jacques Baumer as Lambert  
 Marguerite Moreno as La sous-directrice 
 Georges Bever as Un chauffeur de taxi  
 Rivers Cadet as Un agent  
 Roger Doucet 
 Hélène Flouest 
 Georges Malkine as Un chauffeur de taxi  
 Franck Maurice as Un agent  
 Yves Mirande as Le clochard sur le banc  
 Robert Moor as Un agent  
 Henri Nassiet as Petit rôle 
 Jean Wiener

References

Bibliography 
 Aitken, Ian. The Concise Routledge Encyclopedia of the Documentary Film. Routledge, 2013.

External links 
 

1939 films
French drama films
1939 drama films
1930s French-language films
Films directed by Georges Lacombe
Films directed by Yves Mirande
Films shot at Epinay Studios
French black-and-white films
1930s French films